Mapleview or Maple View may refer to:

Mapleview, Minnesota, a small incorporated city north of and contiguous with Austin, Minnesota
Maple View, New Brunswick, an unincorporated city in Victoria County, New Brunswick
Maple View, West Virginia
Mapleview Centre, a shopping mall in Burlington, Ontario, Canada
Mapleview Heights Elementary School, a school in Barrie, Ontario
Maple View, a community in the city of Quinte West, Ontario
Maple View Sanitarium, in Fayette County, Iowa